A railroad is a means of transport.

Railroad may also refer to:

Places in the United States
 Railroad, Pennsylvania, a borough
 Railroad Township, Starke County, Indiana, a township
 Railroad Canyon, a canyon around some of the San Jacinto River, California
 Railroad Valley, in east-central Nevada 
 Rail Road Flat, California, a census-designated place in Calaveras County
 Rail Road Hill, California, a former settlement in Yuba County

Other uses
 The Railroad, a 2006 South Korean film
 Railroad apartment, an apartment with rooms connecting to each other in a line
 Rail Rode, a 1927 short cartoon
 Railroad (album), an album by guitarist John Fahey
 "Railroad" (song), 1970 Maurice Gibb song
 "Railroad", 1971 song by Status Quo from the album Dog of Two Head
 Thomas and the Magic Railroad, a 2000 British-American film

See also
 Rail-road vehicle, a vehicle for rail and road
 Railroad Tycoon (series), a business simulation game
 Sid Meier's Railroads!, a business simulation computer game
 Rail (disambiguation)
 Railway (disambiguation) (a railroad in British and Commonwealth English)
 Railways (disambiguation)